Janneke Vos (born 20 March 1977) was a Dutch professional racing cyclist from Kockengen, Netherlands.

Palmarès

2000
3rd Points race, Dutch National Track Championships

2005
1st  Dutch National Road Race Championships

References

1977 births
Living people
Dutch male cyclists
People from Breukelen
Cyclists from Utrecht (province)